The Sydney Sandstone Ridgetop Woodland, also known as Coastal Sandstone Ridgetop Woodland and Hornsby Enriched Sandstone Exposed Woodland, is a shrubby woodland and mallee community situated in northern parts of Sydney, Australia, where it is found predominantly on ridgetops and slopes of the Hornsby Plateau, Woronora Plateau and the lower Blue Mountains area. It is an area of high biodiversity, existing on poor sandstone soils, with regular wildfires, and moderate rainfall.

Geography

The Ridgetop Woodland is a low eucalypt forest having a diverse sclerophyll shrub layer, mallees and open groundcover of sedges that sit on the Triassic Hawkesbury sandstone plateaux, which encircle the Sydney Basin. The community is found in areas where the average annual rainfall ranges from 850mm to 1650mm. Around one-quarter of this community has been cleared for urban development, though many areas still remain in conservation reserves. 75-90% of the vegetation zone remains.

Scope
It incorporates Coastal Sandstone Ridgetop Woodland, which is found up to 600m above sea level in areas receiving an average annual rainfall ranging from 850 to 1650 mm. It then grades into heath (e.g. Coastal Sandstone Plateau Heath) where soils become more shallow. In the upper Blue Mountains it is supplanted by Blue Mountains Ridgetop Woodland on the more raised Narrabeen Sandstone, on sandy loams, where there it will grade into the Blue Mountains and Southern Highlands Basalt Forests further west. Coastal Sand plain Heath occurs at Wottamolla, Royal National Park.

Flora 
The area is dominated by Corymbia eximia and Eucalyptus sieberi, which shape a sporadic overstorey enclosed with large shrubs such as Banksia serrata, Leptospermum trinervium and Hakea dactyloides. Smaller shrubs including Leucopogon setiger and Dillwynia floribunda are salient towards the edge of the rock shelf.

See also
Eastern Suburbs Banksia Scrub
Chaparral
Garrigue

References 

Geography of Sydney
Biogeography of New South Wales
Forests of New South Wales
Remnant urban bushland
Vegetation of Australia
Sclerophyll forests
Mallee Woodlands and Shrublands